The Choice is a 2016 American romantic drama film directed by Ross Katz and written by Bryan Sipe, based on Nicholas Sparks' 2007 novel of the same name about two neighbors who fall in love at their first meeting. The movie stars Benjamin Walker, Teresa Palmer, Maggie Grace, Alexandra Daddario, Tom Welling and Tom Wilkinson.

Principal photography began on October 13, 2014, in Wilmington, North Carolina. Lionsgate released the film on February 5, 2016.

Plot
Travis Shaw (Benjamin Walker) is a veterinarian, living in the city of Wilmington, NC, who falls in love on his first meeting with Gabby Holland (Teresa Palmer), who has moved into the house next door.

Their initial meeting, however, is rather rocky as Travis is hosting a noisy backyard picnic, complete with loud music while Gabby is trying to study next door.  Gabby is a medical student who is in a relationship with a fellow doctor, Ryan McCarthy (Tom Welling). Travis has an on again, off again relationship with a girl named Monica.  With Ryan out of state overseeing a new hospital opening, Gabby and Travis spend more time together, starting a relationship.

Ryan returns, and is keen to resume his relationship with Gabby. Unsure of her feelings, Gabby tells Travis that their relationship wasn't necessarily serious, so she says yes to Ryan's marriage proposal. Monica (Alexandra Daddario) breaks up with Travis, telling him that she knows about him and Gabby and that he should fight for her because they love each other. Travis goes to the hospital, only to find out she left after breaking off her engagement with Ryan. Ryan punches him for the affair. Travis then goes to Gabby's family home to propose. After convincing her of his love, she says yes. They marry and over the course of the next few years they have two children and become a happy family.

One evening, after a dinner to which Travis is late due to a work emergency, Gabby drives back home but is involved in an accident with another car. She survives but is now in a coma, which seems permanent. Travis, wracked with guilt, has to decide whether to take her off life support.

After a storm nearly destroys their house, Travis finds the wind chimes that Gabby had on her porch. He goes to his island and builds a gazebo, hanging them there. The shell chime starts to ring in the wind and Travis runs to the hospital where Gabby has woken up from her coma. When he walks in she says "you're late." He takes her home where she is welcomed by the family and Travis' sister's newborn child.

To make up for missing their dinner date Travis and Gabby have one in the front yard, where she tells him she heard everything he said whilst in the coma. Stating that he was "breathing for her." The movie finishes with Travis and Gabby with their children and dogs sitting in the gazebo 'Gabby's Point', looking out onto the shore and up at the stars.

Cast
 Benjamin Walker as Travis Shaw
 Teresa Palmer as Gabby Holland
 Maggie Grace as Stephanie Shaw
 Alexandra Daddario as Monica
 Tom Welling as Dr. Ryan McCarthy
 Tom Wilkinson as Dr. Shep Shaw
 Noree Victoria as Liz
 Brad James as Ben 
 Anna Enger as Megan
 Wilbur Fitzgerald as Mr. Holland
 Callan White as Mrs. Holland
 Jesse C. Boyd as Matt
 Dianne Sellers as Jackie
 Brett Rice as Dr. McCarthy

Production 
On June 10, 2014, Lionsgate acquired the American and United Kingdom rights to make a film adaptation of Nicholas Sparks' 2007 novel The Choice. Bryan Sipe wrote the script for the film, which Sparks, Theresa Park and Peter Safran produced. On September 2, Ross Katz was set to direct the film, which Sparks co-financed and -produced with his Nicholas Sparks Productions, along with Safran's The Safran Company. On September 30, Benjamin Walker was cast to play the lead role in the film, Travis Parker. On the same day, Teresa Palmer was cast as the female lead, Gabby Holland. On October 7, Tom Wilkinson was added to the cast to play Dr. Shep. On October 8, Alexandra Daddario, Tom Welling, and Maggie Grace joined the film. Welling plays Ryan, a doctor at his father's practice who is Gabby's boyfriend, and Grace plays Travis' sister, Stephanie.

Principal photography on the film began on October 13, 2014, in Wilmington, North Carolina, and lasted through November 21. For the first three days, the crew and extras filmed at the Dockside Restaurant & Bar and Bridge Tender Marina along with actors, near Wrightsville Beach. On October 20, filming was taking place at Hanover Seaside Club in Wrightsville Beach. The production later moved to downtown Wilmington, where filming took place in a house.

Reception

Box office
The Choice grossed $18.7 million in North America and $4.7 million in other territories for a worldwide total of $23.4 million.

The film was released in North America on February 5, 2016, alongside Pride and Prejudice and Zombies and Hail, Caesar!. The film was projected to gross $7–9 million from 2,631 theaters in its opening weekend. It made $290,000 from Thursday night previews and $6,050,443 in its opening weekend, finishing fifth at the box office behind Kung Fu Panda 3 ($21.2 million), Hail, Caesar! ($11.4 million), Star Wars: The Force Awakens ($7 million) and The Revenant ($6.9 million).

Critical reception
The Choice received negative reviews from critics. On Rotten Tomatoes, the film has a rating of 11%, based on 84 reviews, with an average rating of 3.57/10. The site's critical consensus reads, "Like the 10 Nicholas Sparks movies before it, The Choice finds tragedy striking star-crossed lovers in the sun-dappled South – yet even for those who loved its predecessors, this gauzy melodrama may feel painfully formulaic." Metacritic reports a score of 26 out of 100, based on 23 critics, indicating "generally unfavorable reviews". Audiences polled by CinemaScore gave the film an average grade of "B+" on an A+ to F scale.

Frank Schenk of the Hollywood Reporter criticized the film as being "the cinematic equivalent of staring at a Hallmark Card for two hours." A. A. Dowd of the A.V. Club called it "a formulaic mush". Moira Macdonald of the Seattle Times wrote the film "moves inexorably to its inevitable tear-jerky end." Andrew Barker of Variety  describes the film as "beginning as a merely mediocre retread of standard Sparksian tropes, veering off into self-parody around the hour-mark, and finally concluding with one of the most brazenly cynical climaxes recently committed to film." Devan Coggan of Entertainment Weekly concluded that the film was a "predictable, recycled mess."

Home media
The Choice was released on DVD and Blu-ray on May 3, 2016.

References

External links
 
 
 
 

2016 films
2016 romantic drama films
American romantic drama films
Films based on works by Nicholas Sparks
Films directed by Ross Katz
Films set in North Carolina
Films shot in North Carolina
Lionsgate films
Wilmington, North Carolina
2010s English-language films
2010s American films